The 2022 California gubernatorial election was held on November 8, 2022, to elect the governor of California, with the statewide top-two primary election taking place on June 7, 2022. Incumbent Democratic Party Governor Gavin Newsom was re-elected to a second term after surviving a recall election in 2021, during his first term.

The elections featured universal mail-in ballots; in-person voting was also available. All statewide elected offices are currently held by Democrats. Newsom won 61.9% of the vote in both the 2018 gubernatorial election and the 2021 recall election. He received 55.9% of the top-two primary vote and faced Republican Party state senator Brian Dahle, who received 17.7% of the primary vote, in the general election. Newsom received 59.2% of the vote to Dahle's 40.8%, a smaller margin of victory than in 2018. Dahle flipped five counties that Newsom carried in 2018, namely Lake, Merced (although Merced voted to recall Newsom), Orange, San Bernardino, and San Joaquin.

Candidates

Democratic Party

Advanced to general 
Gavin Newsom, incumbent governor

Eliminated in primary 
Anthony Fanara, restaurant owner
Armando Perez-Serrato, businessman and candidate in the 2021 recall election
Joel Ventresca, former Service Employees International Union committee member, retired airport analyst and perennial candidate

Republican Party

Advanced to general 
Brian Dahle, state senator from the 1st district and former Minority Leader of the California State Assembly

Eliminated in primary 
Ronald A. Anderson, contractor and businessman
Gurinder Bhangoo (write-in)
Shawn Collins, U.S. Navy veteran and attorney
Ron Jones, former police officer
Jenny Rae Le Roux, entrepreneur and candidate in the 2021 recall election
David Lozano, attorney and candidate in the 2021 recall election
Cristian Raul Morales, manufacturing executive
Robert C. Newman, psychologist and candidate in the 2021 recall election
Lonnie Sortor, business owner
Anthony Trimino, entrepreneur and candidate in the 2021 recall election
Major Williams, entrepreneur and write-in candidate in the 2021 recall election
Leo S. Zacky, businessman, broadcaster, and candidate in the 2021 recall election

Declined 
Larry Elder, conservative talk show host, author, and candidate in the 2021 recall election
Kevin Faulconer, former mayor of San Diego (2014–2020) and candidate in the 2021 recall election
Kimberly Guilfoyle, television personality, former advisor to Donald Trump and ex-wife of Gavin Newsom
Kevin Kiley, state assemblyman from the 6th district (2016–present) and candidate in the 2021 recall election (running for CA-03)

Green Party

Eliminated in primary 
Heather Collins, small business owner and candidate in the 2021 recall election
Luis J. Rodriguez, poet, novelist, and candidate for governor in 2014

American Independent Party

Eliminated in primary 
Jeff Scott (write-in)

No party preference

Eliminated in primary 
Serge Fiankan, small business owner
James G. Hanink, former Loyola Marymount University philosophy professor and candidate in the 2021 recall election
Woodrow Sanders III, entrepreneur and engineer
Frederic C. Schultz, attorney
Reinette Senum, former mayor of Nevada City
Michael Shellenberger, environmental policy writer and Democratic candidate for governor in 2018
Bradley Zink, children's book author

Withdrew 

Endorsements

Primary election 
The list of candidates was announced on Mar 31, 2022 by the Secretary of State.

Polling

Results

General election

Predictions

Debates
Governor Gavin Newsom and State Senator Brian Dahle met on October 23rd for their only debate.

Polling
Aggregate polls

Graphical summary

Gavin Newsom vs. Kevin Faulconer

 
Gavin Newsom vs. John Cox

Gavin Newsom vs. Larry Elder

Gavin Newsom vs. Kevin Kiley

Results 

Counties that flipped from Democratic to Republican
 Lake (largest municipality: Clearlake)
 Merced (largest municipality: Merced)
 Orange (largest municipality: Anaheim)
 San Bernardino (largest municipality: San Bernardino)
 San Joaquin (largest municipality: Stockton)

Notes

See also
 2022 United States gubernatorial elections
 2022 California elections

References

External links 
Official campaign websites
 Brian Dahle (R) for Governor
 Gavin Newsom (D) for Governor

2022
California
Gubernatorial
Gavin Newsom